The shorthorn fangtooth (Anoplogaster brachycera) is a species of fangtooth found in the tropical waters of the Atlantic and Pacific Oceans at depths down to .

Information
This species grows to a length of  SL. The shorthorn fangtooth is known to be found in a marine environment within a bathypelagic depth range of about 0 – 1500 meters. This species is native to a deep-water area. The maximum recorded length of this species as an unsexed male is about 6 centimeters or about 2.36 inches. The shorthorn fangtooth is native to the areas of Pacific and Atlantic oceans, tropical waters, the Sulu Sea, the western Pacific, the Gulf of Mexico, Bahamas Islands, the western Atlantic, and off of the southeastern United States of America.

References

Notes
 

Anoplogastridae
Fish described in 1986